Mount Lincoln is an 8,383-foot-elevation (2,555 meter) mountain summit in Placer County, California, United States.

Description
Mount Lincoln is located two miles south of Donner Pass at Sugar Bowl Ski Resort, on land managed by Tahoe National Forest. It is situated on the crest of the Sierra Nevada mountain range, with precipitation runoff from the peak draining to South Yuba River, North Fork American River, and Truckee River. Neighbors include Mount Disney,  to the northwest, Mount Judah  to the northeast, and the nearest higher peak is Anderson Peak,  to the southeast. The Pacific Crest Trail traverses the east slope of the peak, providing an approach option from Donner Pass.

History

The California Trail, which crossed Roller Pass between Mount Lincoln and Mount Judah, was one of the wagon trails through Donner Pass used by pioneers on the way to Sutter's Fort. In the spring of 1846, 90 people departed Springfield, Illinois, en route to California. The ill-fated journey of the Donner Party tragically ended near here when they were snowbound at Donner Lake before they could cross this pass. Coincidently, Abraham Lincoln was from Springfield. He was a friend of, and lawyer to, James F. Reed who was a member of the Donner Party. Lincoln was interested in California and joining the Donner Party, but decided not to go because of his wife, toddler son, and new political career as a congressman.

As president, Abe Lincoln supported a transcontinental railroad to Northern California, and in 1862 signed the Pacific Railroad Acts to begin construction. The Sierra Nevada posed a big obstacle to the project, and Theodore Judah decided a route for the railroad was best through Donner Pass as it required only one summit crossing rather than the two of other possible options. The Lincoln Highway which crosses Donner Pass was dedicated in 1913 and was the first cross-country road for automobiles, as well as America's first national memorial to President Lincoln. It turned out that Abe Lincoln never set foot in California.

In 1924, Charlie Chaplin filmed scenes on Mount Lincoln for his silent movie classic, The Gold Rush.

In 1957, a ski chair lift was installed on the peak.

This landform's toponym has appeared in publications since at least 1872, and has been officially adopted by the U.S. Board on Geographic Names.

Climate
According to the Köppen climate classification system, Mount Lincoln is located in an alpine climate zone. Most weather fronts originate in the Pacific Ocean and travel east toward the Sierra Nevada mountains. As fronts approach, they are forced upward by the peaks (orographic lift), causing them to drop their moisture in the form of rain or snowfall onto the range. There are five ski areas at Donner Pass.

Gallery

See also
 
 Sugar Bowl Ski Resort
 Mount Lincoln

References

External links
 Weather forecast: Mount Lincoln
 Mount Lincoln - Charlie Chaplin: Donner Summit Historical Society

North American 2000 m summits
Mountains of Northern California
Tahoe National Forest
Mountains of the Sierra Nevada (United States)
Mountains of Placer County, California